The Maharashtra Education Society (MES) is one of the oldest private education institutions in Pune, India. It was founded in 1860 as the Poona Native Institution by  Waman Prabhakar Bhave, Laxman Nahar Indapurkar, and the revolutionary leader Vasudeo Balwant Phadke.

At present the society runs over 77 institutions including schools, colleges, vocational training institutions and a hospital in various towns and cities in Western Maharashtra such as Saswad, Baramati, Panvel, Belapur, Kalamboli, Shirwal, Kasar Amboli, Navi Mumbai, Ahmednagar, Pune and Chiplun.

Institutions run by the society

Schools 

 MES Boys' High School, Pune Bhave School, Pune
 Adyakrantiveer Vasudev Balvant Phadke Vidyalaya, Panvel
 Bal Vikas Mandir, Saswad 
 Bal Shikshan Mandir, Pune
 Dnyan Mandir, Kalmboli
 Kei (Late) D.S. Renavikar Vidya Mandir, AhmedNagar
 MES Adyakrantiveer Vasudev Balwant Phadke Vidyalaya, English Medium Primary
 MES English Medium School, Baramati
 MES English Medium school, Shirwal
 MES English Medium High School, Shirwal
 MES Late Gajanan Bhivrao Deshpande Vidyalaya, Baramati (MES Highschool)
 MES Public School, High School (CBSE), Kalamboli
 Pre Primary School, Ahmednagar
 Pre Primary School, Baramati
 Pre Primary School, Pune
 Pre Primary School, Saswad
 Pre Primary School, Shirwal
 Pre-Primary School, Savedi
 Public School, Pre-Primary School (CBSE), Kalamboli
 Rani Laxmibai Mulinchi Sainiki Shala, Kasar Amboli
 Renavikar Madhyamik Vidyalaya, Ahmednagar
 Renuka Swarup Memorial Girls Highschool
 Sau Nirmala Haribhau Deshpande, Primary School
 Shishu Mandir, Pune
 Vidya Mandir, Belapur
 Vimlabai Garware High school, Pune
 Waghire Vidyalaya, Saswad

Colleges 

 Abasaheb Garware College, Pune
 Ayurved Mahavidyalay in Khed, Ratnagiri
 Bhave High School (also has a Junior College)
 Community College of Indira Gandhi National Open University (associate branch)
 Garware College of Commerce, Pune 
 Institute of Management and Career Courses, Pune
 MES Higher Secondary School, Junior College, Belapur
 MES Higher Secondary School, Junior College, Kothrud
 MES Late Gajananrao Bhivrao Deshpande Vidyalaya, Junior College, Baramati
 MES School Of Nursing and Junior College
 Night College Of Arts and Commerce
 Rani Laxmibai Mulinchi Sainiki Shala and Junior College
 Renuka Swarup Memorial Girls High School and Junior College
 Sou Vimalabai Garware Highschool and Junior College
 Waghire Vidyala and Junior College, Saswad

Medical Colleges 
 College of Nursing in Khed, Ratnagiri
 College of Optometry in association with Yashwantrao Chavan Maharashtra Open University
 School of paramedical Science

Hospital 
 Parshuram Hospital And Research Centre, Chiplun.

Others 

 Academy for Career Excellence
 Centre For Resources And Strategic Planning
 College Hostel
 Deen Dayal Upadhyay Kaushal Kendra
 Krida Vardhini
 MES Auditorium
 Medical College Hostel
 Personality Development Center
 Renuka Swaroop Institute Of Career Courses
 Saraswati Niwas
 Shakti Gymnasium
 Shikshan Prabodhini
 Shooting Range

See also 
 Deccan Education Society

References

External links
 

 
Education in Maharashtra
Educational organisations in Maharashtra
1860 establishments in India